Victor-Thérèse Charpentier d'Ennery (March 24, 1732 – December 13, 1776) was the marquis, and later count, of Ennery and was also a governor general of Saint-Domingue in the mid-to-late 18th century.

Family 
Charpentier was born in Paris, France to Thomas-Jacques Charpentier d'Ennery and Madeleine Angélique Rioult de Curzay. Charpentier d'Ennery is the grandson of Jacques Charpentier d'Ennery, the Lord of D'Ennery and Espier. He had a sister, Cécile Pauline Charpentier d'Ennery, who married Gilbert de Chauvigny de Blot, a governor of Chantelle. On January 11, 1768, in Paris, he married Benedicte d'Alesso, a descendant of Philip I of France, and had one child:

~Pauline François de Paule Charpentier (died 1819) 
married Pierre-Marc-Gaston de Lévis, son of Francois de Gaston, Chevalier de Levis. 

Charpentier also had another child with Olive Puybaudet:

~Geneviève Pauline Aimée Charpentier (1776–1850), who married Louis de Tibi (died 1802) and then married Joseph Castel.

Accomplishments 
Charpentier was Count and later the Marquis of d'Ennery and also the governor-general of Saint-Domingue. He was also the Governor of Martinique from 1765 to 1768 and also the governor general of the Windward Islands from 1768 to 1771, four years before his death.

Descendants 

1) Pauline d'Ennery
         
         Adele-Charlotte, Duchess of Levis
                     
                      Raymond de Nicolay
                      Aymar de Nicolay

       Gaston Francois, Duke of Levis

2) ???

3) Aimée CASTEL née D'ENNERY (many descendants, including):
        Elisabeth Henriette DÉJOIE FRANGEUL née CASTEL
           Charles FRANGEUL 
              Julia PRÉZEAU née FRANGEUL
                Yvonne LIAUTAUD née PRÉZEAU
                    Gerard LIAUTAUD
                        Olivier Liautaud
                    Colette SANSARICQ née LIAUTAUD
                        Reginald SANSARICQ
                                       Noëlle PEREZ née SANSARICQ
                                               George PEREZ
                                               Thomas PEREZ
                                       Renée SANSARICQ
                                       Julian SANSARICQ
                        Evelyne ORESKOVICH née SANSARICQ
                        Jean Paul SANSARICQ
                    Jacqueline MANGONES née LIAUTAUD
                        Jean Gilbert ROOZEN
                        Josette TKACIK née ROOZEN
                                       Tomas Tkacik

Noble Titles 

Because of his inability to produce a male heir, the title Count d'Ennery was not succeeded and died out after his death.

Death 
Victor-Therese Charpentier died on December 31, 1776, in Port-au-Prince, during the Uprisings. His final resting place is in a large, beautiful memorial commissioned by his widow and his sister, the Madame de Blot. The memorial portrays his widow and sister grieving by his grave with child. The memorial can be found in the Louvre Museum.

References 

Colonial and Departmental Heads of Martinique

1732 births
1776 deaths
Nobility from Paris
Counts of France
Governors of Saint-Domingue
People of Saint-Domingue
French Governors of Martinique